Suzanne Morrow Francis or Dr. Suzanne Morrow Francis (December 14, 1930 – June 11, 2006) was a Canadian figure skater and a Veterinarian. She competed in Ladies' Singles in the 1948 and 1952 Winter Olympics.  Between 1947 and 1948, Francis competed in Pairs Mixed competitions with Canadian figure skater Wallace Diestelmeyer. Together they won the bronze medal at the 1948 Winter Olympics and the 1948 World Figure Skating Championships.  They were the first pair team to perform the death spiral one-handed, with the man holding the woman in position with one hand, at the 1948 Olympic Games.

Life 
Competing in Ladies' Singles, Suzanne Morrow Francis came in 14th at the St. Moritz Winter Olympics but ended up in 6th place at the 1952 Oslo Winter Olympics.

In 1952, Francis also earned her degree in veterinary medicine from the Ontario Veterinary College located at the University of Guelph in Guelph, Ontario. She retired from competition in 1953 but did not sever ties with figure skating. While working as a Veterinarian, Francis also continued to serve as a figure skating judge and has been for over fifty years. Additionally, she planned to work to work with the Peterborough Figure Skating Club. Also, she was included in the top six women skaters in the world five years prior to when she had retired. For a time, Francis shared a clinic with Dr. Edith Williams, the second Canadian woman to earn a degree as a veterinarian. During that time, she also served as an All Breed dog show judge as part of the Canadian Kennel Club.

She has always loved dogs and would not turn away from any animal that was needed of care. It did not matter where she was she always had a dog by her side. Her favourite dog was a German Shepherd. Other than the time she went to College in Guelph for Veterinarian School her longest time she spent in school was two months because figure skating took up the majority of her time. As well, because of this she mostly relied on tutors to get the help she needed to get through school.

At the 1988 Winter Olympics in Calgary, Francis took the Judge's Oath, the first woman to do so at the Winter Olympics. In 1992, she was inducted into the Skate Canada Hall of Fame together with Diestelmeyer. She continued working as a veterinarian until retirement in 1995.

Francis' Figure Skating Records

Ladies singles

Pairs Mixed with Wallace Diestelmeyer

Ice dance with Wallace Diestelmeyer

References

External links

IOC 1988 Winter Olympics (shown as Suzanna Morrow-Francis)
Wendl, Karel. "The Olympic Oath - A Brief History" Citius, Altius, Fortius (Journal of Olympic History since 1997). Winter 1995. pp. 4,5.
databaseOlympics.com: Suzanne Morrow

1930 births
2006 deaths
Canadian female single skaters
Canadian female pair skaters
Canadian female ice dancers
Canadian veterinarians
Figure skaters from Toronto
Figure skaters at the 1948 Winter Olympics
Figure skaters at the 1952 Winter Olympics
Olympic bronze medalists for Canada
Olympic figure skaters of Canada
Olympic medalists in figure skating
Olympic officials
World Figure Skating Championships medalists
Medalists at the 1948 Winter Olympics
Women veterinarians
Oath takers at the Olympic Games